The Monte Cristo of Prague (German: Der Monte Christo von Prag) is a 1929 Austrian-Czech silent adventure film directed by Hans Otto and starring Albert Heine, Valerie Boothby and Walter Rilla.

Cast
 Albert Heine as John Orel  
 Valerie Boothby as Mary  
 Walter Rilla as Fred Born  
 Jan W. Speerger as Egon Bernhard  
 Clementine Plessner as Fred's Mother 
 Iris Arlan as Elly Hubert  
 Josef Rovenský as George Richell  
 Theodor Pistek as Prison Guard 
 Hans Homma as Examining Judge 
 Hans Effenberger

References

Bibliography
 Hans-Michael Bock and Tim Bergfelder. The Concise Cinegraph: An Encyclopedia of German Cinema. Berghahn Books, 2009.

External links

1929 films
Films directed by Hans Otto
Austrian silent feature films
Czech silent films
1929 adventure films
Czech adventure films
Austrian adventure films
Czech black-and-white films
Austrian black-and-white films
Czechoslovak adventure films
Silent adventure films